Derick Fernando da Silva (born 16 May 2002), simply known as Derick, is a Brazilian footballer who plays for Santos as a central defender.

Club career
Born in Santos, São Paulo, Derick joined Santos' youth setup in March 2015, from Sumaré. On 4 October 2018, he signed his first professional contract after agreeing to a three-year deal.

On 8 September 2020, as starters Lucas Veríssimo and Luan Peres were suspended and immediate backup Luiz Felipe was injured, Derick was called up to the first team for a Série A match against Atlético Mineiro. He made his professional debut the following day, coming on as a second-half substitute for Madson in the 3–1 success at the Vila Belmiro.

On 27 April 2021, Derick renewed his contract with Santos until March 2026.

International career
Derick was called up to Brazil under-15s for the 2017 Nike Friendlies, playing in all three matches of the competition. During the 2018 season, he represented the under-17 squad in the Montaigu Tournament and in the Nike Friendlies.

Career statistics

References

External links
Santos FC profile 

2002 births
Living people
Sportspeople from Santos, São Paulo
Brazilian footballers
Association football defenders
Campeonato Brasileiro Série A players
Santos FC players
Brazil youth international footballers